Vitaly Serhiiovych Anikeyenko (2 January 1987 – 7 September 2011) was a Ukrainian-Russian professional ice hockey player.

Life
Born in Kyiv, Anikeyenko spent the entirety of his professional hockey career with Lokomotiv Yaroslavl of the Kontinental Hockey League, save for a loan spell with Metallurg Novokuznetsk during 2007–08. He was a member of the Russian national team that competed in the IIHF World Championship's under 18 and under 20 levels; winning a silver medal for the country in 2007. Anikeyenko was drafted 70th overall in the 2005 NHL Entry Draft by the Ottawa Senators.

Death

On 7 September 2011, Anikeyenko was killed in a plane crash when a Yakovlev Yak-42 passenger aircraft, carrying nearly his entire Lokomotiv Yaroslavl team, crashed at Tunoshna Airport, just outside the city of Yaroslavl, Russia. The team was traveling to Minsk to play their opening game of the season, with its coaching staff and prospects. Lokomotiv officials confirmed that the entire main roster was on the flight, including four players from the junior team. The bodies of Ukrainian teammates Anikeyenko and Daniil Sobchenko were repatriated following the crash for burial in Ukraine. The funeral was held on 10 September at Sovskoe cemetery in Kyiv.

Career statistics

Regular season and playoffs

International

See also
 List of ice hockey players who died during their playing career

References

External links

 Vitaly Anikeyenko player profile at RussianProspects.com

1987 births
2011 deaths
Metallurg Novokuznetsk players
Lokomotiv Yaroslavl players
Ottawa Senators draft picks
Russian ice hockey defencemen
Russian people of Ukrainian descent
Sportspeople from Kyiv
Ukrainian expatriate sportspeople in Russia
Ukrainian ice hockey defencemen
Victims of the Lokomotiv Yaroslavl plane crash